Güneyqışlaq (also, Gyuneykyshlak, Gyuney-Kishlak, and Tyuneykishlakh) is a village in the Khizi Rayon of Azerbaijan.  The village forms part of the municipality of Baxışlı.

References 

Populated places in Khizi District